The Zune 4, Zune 8, and Zune 16 are second-generation models of the Zune lineup, they were first announced on October 2, 2007 and released on November 13, 2007 in the United States and June 13, 2008 in Canada. They are flash memory-based players meant to compete with the iPod Nano and the Sansa Fuze, both smaller and cheaper than the three hard drive-based Zune devices, the Zune 30, Zune 80, and Zune 120. They feature music, video, and podcast support, and come with Wi-Fi and FM Radio.

Overview
The D-pad of the original Zune has been replaced by the Zune pad, which allows for touch-sensitive controls in addition to 5-way clicking. Wi-Fi is used for wireless synchronization and for sharing photos, podcasts, and music with other Zunes, although shared songs may only be played three times by the receiving Zune. The FM Radio includes RBDS support for displaying song and station metadata, but does not support HD-Radio. The flash Zune models also feature scratch resistant glass screens, similar to the screens used on the v2 Zunes.

Reception

The Zune 4, 8, and 16 have gotten generally positive reception. Positives and negatives mimic those of the Zune 80 and 120, as the 4, 8, and 16 are very similar devices in a smaller package: the Wi-Fi, user interface, and excellent sound quality are praised. Some reviews have mentioned the lack of TV shows in the Zune Marketplace, it has since been updated with the ability to purchase and rent TV shows and movies.

Specifications
The specifications as listed by the official web site of the Zune:

 1.8-inch color display with 320×240 resolution
 4, 8, and 16 GB flash memory options
 CPU: 399 MHz ARM Core Freescale i.MX31L
 RAM: 64MB
 802.11b/g Wi-Fi compatible with open, WEP, WPA, and WPA2 authentication modes and WEP 64-bit and 128-bit, TKIP, and AES encryption modes
 Built in Li-Ion rechargeable with up to 24 hours of audio playback (wireless off) and video, up to 4 hours
 Size: 41.4 mm x 91.5 mm x 8.5 mm
 Weight: 1.7 ounces (47 grams)
 FM radio tuner
 Audio support:
 CBR and VBR audio, up to 48 kHz sample rate:
 WMA Standard Up to 320 kbit/s
 WMA Pro stereo up to 384 kbit/s
 WMA Lossless stereo up to 384 kbit/s
 Advanced Audio Coding (AAC)(.mp4, .m4a, .m4b, .mov) up to 320 kbit/s
 MP3 (.mp3): up to 320 kbit/s
 Video Support:
 CBR or VBR for:
 WMV Main and Simple Profile
 MPEG-4 Part 2 Advanced Simple Profile up to 2.5 Mbit/s bit rate
 H.264 Baseline profile up to 2.5 Mbit/s
 Picture Support:
 JPEG (.jpg)

References

External links
Product overview on Zune.net
Information about the Zune and question / answers

Portable media players
Zune
Audiovisual introductions in 2007